Əcəxur (also, Adzhakhur and Adzhkhur) is a village and municipality in the Qusar Rayon of Azerbaijan.  It has a population of 786.  The municipality consists of the villages of Əcəxur and Əcəxuroba.

References 

Populated places in Qusar District